{{DISPLAYTITLE:Adenosine A3 receptor}}

The adenosine A3 receptor, also known as ADORA3, is an adenosine receptor, but also denotes the human gene encoding it.

Function 

Adenosine A3 receptors are G protein-coupled receptors that couple to Gi/Gq and are involved in a variety of intracellular signaling pathways and physiological functions. It mediates a sustained cardioprotective function during cardiac ischemia, it is involved in the inhibition of neutrophil degranulation in neutrophil-mediated tissue injury, it has been implicated in both neuroprotective and neurodegenerative effects, and it may also mediate both cell proliferation and cell death.
Recent publications demonstrate that adenosine A3 receptor antagonists (SSR161421) could have therapeutic potential in bronchial asthma (17,18).

Gene 
Multiple transcript variants encoding different isoforms have been found for this gene.

Therapeutic implications 
An adenosine A3 receptor agonist (CF-101) is in clinical trials for the treatment of rheumatoid arthritis.
In a mouse model of infarction the A3 selective agonist CP-532,903 protected against myocardial ischemia and reperfusion injury.

Selective Ligands
A number of selective A3 ligands are available.

Agonists/Positive Allosteric Modulators
 2-(1-Hexynyl)-N-methyladenosine
 CF-101 (IB-MECA)
 CF-102
 2-Cl-IB-MECA
 CP-532,903
 Inosine
 LUF-6000
 MRS-3558
 AST-004

Antagonists/Negative Allosteric Modulators
 KF-26777
 MRS-545
 MRS-1191
 MRS-1220
 MRS-1334
 MRS-1523
 MRS-3777
 MRE-3005-F20
 MRE-3008-F20
 PSB-11
 OT-7999
 VUF-5574
 SSR161421
 ISAM-DM10

Inverse Agonists
 PSB-10

References

Further reading

External links 
 
 

Adenosine receptors